

Station List

E